Everyone Else Burns  is a British sitcom made for Channel 4 by JAX Media and Universal International Studios, starring Simon Bird, Kate O'Flynn, Amy James-Kelly, Harry Connor and Morgana Robinson. The six-part series premiered in the United Kingdom on 23 January 2023 with episodes also available on streaming service All4.

Synopsis
A coming-of-age sitcom about a Manchester family who are part of a puritanical Christian sect.

Cast 
 Simon Bird as David Lewis 
 Kate O'Flynn as Fiona Lewis 
 Amy James-Kelly as Rachel Lewis
 Harry Connor as Aaron Lewis
 Morgana Robinson as Melissa
 Lolly Adefope as Miss Simmons
 Ali Khan as Joshua
 Kadiff Kirwan as Andrew
 Arsher Ali as Elder Samson
 Liam Williams as Joel
 Al Roberts as Elder Abijah
 Soph Galustian as Julia

Production
Channel 4 announced the project had been commissioned on 5 May 2022 with the cast in place and JAX Media and Universal International Studios producing from a script written by Dillon Mapletoft and Oliver Taylor, and Nick Collett as director. Speaking about his wig for the show Bird told The Independent "My first reaction [upon seeing the wig] was laughter, annoyingly, which was pretty much everyone’s reaction. Which meant that we had to go ahead with it."

Broadcast
Everyone Else Burns premiered in the UK on Channel 4 at 10pm on 23 January 2023. The series consists of six episodes in total, which are also available to on the streaming network All4.

Reception
Writing in The Daily Telegraph Anita Singh said "there is much to enjoy here. It's not a comedy going for cheap laughs about Christianity. It is a show about family, and it has a lot of heart." About the comedy Singh said "Much of the comedy comes from the subversion of norms. David and Fiona are appalled that Rachel has studied for her exams when she should have been out preaching. "Straight As, five out of five for effort. Where did we go wrong?" and "every line has a comic payoff and every character, from the leads down to the supporting players, is well-written… there are truths about family and friends that make it seem like more than a throwaway sitcom." Lucy Mangan in The Guardian commented "The jokes come thick, fast and funny... The hyper-religiosity is used to look anew at family dynamics and dysfunction; how blind you can be to abnormalities if they are all you know; and the need to break free. Mapletoft and Taylor do this without mocking faith itself... it's simply very, very funny, all the way. I'm a convert." Carol Midgely in The Times said "It was a small delight. It wouldn't work half as well without Bird's manic energy as David, a pompous loser narcissist who makes his family do practice runs for the end of the world and has the worst pudding bowl haircut in Christendom." Also adding "it is sharply, wittily written too. The rest of the cast is strong… it is a brave comedy that targets religion, but only a clever one could do it with this much heart and jolliness."

References

External links
 
 

2023 British television series debuts
2020s British sitcoms
Channel 4 sitcoms
English-language television shows
Fiction about cults
Television series about Christianity
Television series about dysfunctional families
Television series about marriage
Television series by Universal Television
Television shows set in Manchester